Autoroute 19, also known as Autoroute Papineau (Papineau Highway), is an autoroute in Quebec. It crosses the Rivière des Prairies via the Papineau-Leblanc Bridge, connecting the borough of Ahuntsic-Cartierville in Montreal and the Duvernay neighbourhood in Laval.

There are plans to widen Route 335 to four lanes, which would be a continuation of A-19 from Autoroute 440 to the Athanase David Bridge, on Rivière des Mille Îles, and Bois-des-Filion to relieve congestion along that stretch. The lands reserved for the project were expropriated in 1973 in conjunction of a future extension of the A-19. In 2007 Transport Minister Julie Boulet gave the green light for studies in the area.

A super two highway exists in Bois-des-Filion, north of Route 344 and south of Autoroute 640, just north of Pont David, which runs on the Highway 19 right-of-way.

The city street Papineau Avenue in Montreal is signed as Autoroute 19, from Autoroute 40 northwards. It was once envisioned that A-19 would extend to the Jacques Cartier Bridge, and run below surface level south of the Metropolitan Expressway, like the Decarie Expressway. An autoroute-grade limited access expressway exists between the southern end of the Jacques Cartier Bridge and the northern end of the limited access expressway portion Route 116/Route 112 in St. Hubert, that is otherwise unsigned. The 112/116 expressway from the Jacques Cartier Bridge approach (the southern end of A-19) to Quebec Autoroute 30 was to have been designated Quebec Autoroute 16.

Year of construction 

1970: Henri-Bourassa Blvd. to Lévesque Blvd.
1972: Lévesque Blvd. to St-Martin Blvd. (formerly Route 148) 
1976: St-Martin Blvd. (formerly Route 148) to Autoroute 440
1990: Laval freeway (Autoroute 440) to Dagenais Blvd.

Annual Average Daily Traffic 

Lowest Annual Average Daily Traffic : 12 400 (between R-148 and A-440) (2000)
Highest Annual Average Daily Traffic : 57 000 (Papineau-Leblanc Bridge) (2000)

Major intersections

2006 Highway Overpass collapse 

On September 30, 2006, at 12:30PM EDT, an overpass on Boulevard de la Concorde (Exit 5) collapsed onto the busy Autoroute 19 in Laval. Two vehicles were crushed underneath, while three others and a motorcycle fell from the top. Five people were killed and six others were injured, including three critically. There have been numerous reports from witnesses who saw the two vehicles being crushed underneath the structure. The overpass bridge, built in 1970, had been rated for 35 more years of service and had a maintenance check one year earlier, in 2005. The police called Transports Quebec to report fallen chunks of concrete one hour before the collapse, and a Transports Quebec team had visually inspected the span less than thirty minutes prior to the collapse. The section between Autoroute 440 and Boulevard Levesque was reopened four weeks later. An estimated 60 000 motorists use the highway and connected bridge to the Island of Montreal daily. Traffic and bus re-routing as well as park-and-ride measures were being managed by Transports Quebec (see external link below).
In light of the incident, the Quebec government announced a public investigation headed by former premier Pierre-Marc Johnson into the matter. The remainder of the structure was demolished on October 21 after further inspection of the remains. A nearby overpass was also ordered to be demolished due to structural concerns.

The replacement overpass for Boulevard de la Concorde opened to traffic on June 13, 2007.

See also 
List of bridges spanning the Rivière des Prairies
 List of crossings of the Rivière des Mille Îles
List of crossings of the Rivière des Prairies

References

External links 

Public inquiry website
Transport Quebec website
Transports Quebec Map 
A-19 at motorways-exits.com
A-19 at Quebec Autoroutes
Steve Anderson's MontrealRoads.com: Papineau Autoroute (A-19)

19
Roads in Laval, Quebec
Roads in Montreal